In mathematics and astrophysics, the Strömgren integral, introduced by  while computing the Rosseland mean opacity, is the integral:

 discussed applications of the Strömgren integral in astrophysics, and  discussed how to compute it.

References

External links
Stromgren integral

Special functions
Astrophysics